The 2015–16 EuroCup Women is the fourteenth edition of FIBA Europe's second-tier international competition for women's basketball clubs under such name.

Teams 
Teams and seedings were unveiled by FIBA Europe on 3 July 2015.

Pots 
Teams were first divided into conferences based on geographical location, then seeded based on their club rankings.

 Following the withdrawal of BK Brno from both Euroleague and Eurocup competition for the year, Orange Blizzards and Fribourg both qualified for the final tournament. The spot previously held by the loser of the Euroleague qualifying round was awarded to Orange Blizzards.

Group stage

Group A

Group B

Group C

Group D

Group E

Group F

Group G

Group H

Round of 16
Round of 16 was played on 7 and 14 January 2016.

Round of 8
Round of 8 was played on 28 January and 4 February 2016.

Quarter-finals
Quarter-finals will be played on 8 and 11 March 2016.

Semifinals

Final

See also 
 2015–16 EuroLeague Women

References

External links
EuroCup Women website

EuroCup Women seasons
2